Eugene Harvey is an American Magic: The Gathering player. His major successes include four Pro Tour top eights, and five Grand Prix top eights. Harvey was part of the US national team that won the World Championship in 2001, which was Harvey's first Pro Tour. He also won the 2002 US National Championship.

Achievements

References

American Magic: The Gathering players
Living people
Year of birth missing (living people)
People from Hillsborough Township, New Jersey